The 1979 World Table Tennis Championships – Corbillon Cup (women's team) was the 28th edition of the women's team championship.

China won the gold medal defeating North Korea 3–0 in the final, Japan won the bronze medal.

Medalists

Final tables

Group A

Group B

Third Place Play Off

Final

See also
List of World Table Tennis Championships medalists

References

-
1979 in women's table tennis